Haris Ali (born 27 May 1994) is a Pakistani first-class cricketer who plays for Karachi.

References

External links
 

1994 births
Living people
Pakistani cricketers
Karachi cricketers
Sui Southern Gas Company cricketers
Port Qasim Authority cricketers